Blacktown City Council is a local government area in Western Sydney, situated on the Cumberland Plain, approximately  west of the Sydney central business district, in the state of New South Wales, Australia.

The Mayor of the Blacktown City Council is Cr. Tony Bleasdale, OAM, a member of the Australian Labor Party, who was elected on 9 October 2019 following the resignation of Stephen Bali, MP.

Suburbs and localities of the City of Blacktown 
These are the suburbs and localities in the local government area:

History

The first road from Prospect to Richmond became known as the "Black Town Road" and in 1860 the Railway Department gave the name of "Black Town Road Station" to the railway station at the junction of the railway and the Black Town Road, with the name shortening to "Blacktown" by 1862. The Blacktown area was first incorporated on 6 March 1906 as the "Shire of Blacktown" alongside 132 other new shires across the state as a result of the passing of the Local Government (Shires) Act, 1905. The first five-member temporary council was appointed on 15 May 1906 and first met on 20 June in the Rooty Hill School of Arts. The Blacktown Shire became the "Municipality of Blacktown" on 17 June 1961 and was granted city status on 9 March 1979, becoming the "City of Blacktown".

Blacktown Council Chambers and Civic Centre
 In 1937 Blacktown council discussed the need for new Council Chambers, with the present arrangements seen as inadequate and unable to accommodate growing staff needs. In August 1938, the council discussed two schemes from architect Leslie J. Buckland for the new council chambers, with the scheme that created a new wing facing Flushcombe Road while retaining the old council chambers for other uses being the most favoured. Designed in the modernist Inter-war Functionalist style by Buckland and constructed by J. H. Abbey of Epping at a cost of £7,000, the Council Chambers were officially opened on 29 July 1939 by the Minister for Public Works and Local Government, Eric Spooner.

By the early 1960s, Blacktown Council resolved to develop a new council seat and 'civic centre' and an International style design by Parramatta architects, Leslie J. Buckland & Druce (George Harley, project architect), for a multi-storey administration building, a performance hall, library and basement parking was accepted at a cost of £500,000. Built of concrete and brick, with decorative facade panels and glass curtain walling, the Civic Centre was constructed by S. J. Wood & Co Lty Ltd, with A. S. Nicholson as the consulting engineer.

The foundation stone for the Civic Centre was laid by Premier of NSW, Bob Heffron, on 17 June 1961, on the same occasion marking the change of Blacktown from a Shire to a Municipality. The Civic Centre was officially opened on 25 October 1965 by the Minister for Local Government and Highways, Pat Morton, with the Mayor, Alfred Ashley-Brown, declaring "It is my sincere wish we will as a council cherish the heritage which brings us here tonight - that this chamber will be a place wherein good government within our sphere of responsibility will be made manifest, and that all decisions which are made shall be for the good of the people of the Municipality of Blacktown". On 10 April 1967, the old 1939 Council Chambers were transformed into the first Blacktown Municipal Library, which was later demolished and became the Max Webber Library from 1980.

In 1984, with the Civic Centre being overcrowded and suffering from lack of space, the Council approved significant extensions to the Civic Centre at a cost of $2,781,550 that added 2,000 square metres of office floor space and enabled the consolidation of all Council departments in a single location. The extensions were constructed by McNamara Constructions Pty Limited.

Blacktown City Libraries
However it was not until the 1960s, with the significant growth in the area's population, the Council identified a clear need for a library service, and when the Civic Centre opened in 1965, Council appointed the first Chief Librarian in 1966 and resolved to establish the first library in the old 1939 Council Chambers building on the opposite side of Flushcombe Road. The first Blacktown Municipal Library was officially opened on 10 April 1967.

The Blacktown City Libraries service expanded with the opening of Library Branches at Lalor Park (1968), Mount Druitt (1977) and Riverstone (1978). In 1979, Blacktown council commissioned a new Blacktown branch library, with the old library and 1939 Council Chambers building demolished and replaced by a new building designed by architects Allen Jack & Cottier, and constructed by R. W. Tims (Builders) Pty Ltd. On 31 October 1979, Council resolved to name this new library after the Town Clerk of Blacktown, Max Webber, and the Max Webber Library was officially opened by the Deputy Premier Jack Ferguson on 8 March 1980. A new branch library in Stanhope Gardens was officially opened on 7 August 2009, and was also named after a former Town Clerk as the Dennis Johnson Branch Library.

Demographics
Aboriginal and Torres Strait Islander people made up 2.8 per cent of the population, roughly equal to the NSW and Australian averages of 2.9 and 2.8 per cent respectively. The median age of people in the City of Blacktown was 33 years, which was significantly lower than the national median of 38 years. Children aged 0 – 14 years made up 22.8 per cent of the population and people aged 65 years and over made up 9.0-10.3 per cent of the population. Of people in the area aged 15 years and over, 52.3 per cent were married and 9.9 per cent were either divorced or separated.

At the 2016 census, the population in the local government area increased by 11.91 per cent. When compared with total population growth of Australia for the same period, being 8.8 per cent, population growth in Blacktown local government area was in excess of 35% more than the national average. The median weekly income for residents within the City of Blacktown was generally on par with the national average.

At the 2016 census, the proportion of residents in the Blacktown local government area who stated their ancestry as Filipino, was in excess of six times the national average. The proportion of residents who stated a religious affiliation with Hinduism was in excess of three times the national average; the proportion of Catholics was 33 per cent above the national average; and the proportion of residents with no religion about half the national average. Meanwhile, as at the census date, the area was linguistically diverse, with Tagalog, Hindi, Punjabi, or Filipino languages spoken in households, and ranged from five times to eight times the national averages. Pacific Island languages such as Samoan and Tongan were also noticeable in the area.

Council

Current composition and election method
Blacktown City Council is composed of fifteen Councillors elected proportionally as five separate wards, each electing three Councillors. All Councillors are elected for a fixed four-year term of office. The Mayor is elected by the Councillors at the first meeting of the Council and since 2016 has served a two-year term. The Mayor from 2014 to 2019, Stephen Bali was required to stand down from Council as a Mayor and Councillor by October 2019, due to the Local Government Amendment (Members of Parliament) Act, 2012 which requires state members of parliament to relinquish local government offices no more than two years after their election. With Bali's resignation on 9 October 2019, Cr Tony Bleasdale was elected Mayor.

The most recent election was held on 4 December 2021, and the makeup of the council is as follows:

The current Council, elected in 2021, in order of election by ward, is:

Office-holders

Shire Presidents and Mayors

Shire/Town Clerks and General Managers

Coat of arms
After becoming a city in 1979, the Council resolved to investigate and if possible obtain a coat of arms, making a request to the Chester Herald of Arms, Hubert Chesshyre. With the design completed by March 1981, Council resolved to adopt the Coat of Arms at its meeting on 1 April 1981.

Heritage listings
The City of Blacktown has a number of heritage-listed sites, including those on the New South Wales State Heritage Register:
 Prospect, Upper Canal System
 Prospect, Great Western Highway: Veteran Hall Remains
 Prospect, Ponds Road: St Bartholomew's Anglican Church and Cemetery
 Prospect, Reservoir Road: Former Great Western Road Alignment, Prospect
 Prospect, Reservoir Road: Prospect Reservoir
 Prospect, East of Reservoir: Prospect Reservoir Valve House
 Prospect, 385 Reservoir Road: Royal Cricketers Arms Inn
 Prospect, 23 Tarlington Place: Prospect Post Office

Sister cities 
Blacktown City Council has sister city relations with the following cities:
 Porirua, Wellington Region, North Island, New Zealand, since 1984
 Suseong-gu, Daegu, South Korea, since 1994
 Liaocheng, Shandong, China, since 2003
 Liverpool Plains, New South Wales, Australia, since 2005

References

External links 

City of Blacktown's website

 
Blacktown
1906 establishments in Australia
Blacktown
Shire Presidents and Mayors of Blacktown